The episclera is the outermost layer of the sclera (the white of the eye). It is composed of loose, fibrous, elastic tissue and attaches to Tenon's capsule.

A vascular plexus is found between the bulbar conjunctiva and the sclera consisting of two layers of vessels, the superficial episcleral vessels and the deep episcleral vessels.

Clinical significance
In episcleritis, the episclera and Tenon's capsule are infiltrated with inflammatory cells.

References

Human eye anatomy